Watersmeet House is a National Trust property located some  east of Lynmouth, in the English county of Devon. A former fishing lodge, it is today used as an information centre, tea room and shop by the National Trust. Adjoining the house is the Watersmeet SSSI, a Site of Special Scientific Interest.

The house, which dates from approximately 1832, was built for Walter Stevenson Halliday. It stands at the bottom of a deep gorge at the confluence of the East Lyn River and Hoar Oak Water. The house itself lies on the east bank of the river in the civil parish of Brendon and Countisbury, although the other bank is in Lynton and Lynmouth parish. Approximately  from the house on the bank of the river are a pair of lime kilns dating from the late 18th or early 19th century. The site has been a tea garden since 1901, and has been owned by the National Trust since 1936.

The  Watersmeet SSSI, partly situated on land also owned by the National Trust, includes an extensive area of ancient oak woodland. The woodland is notable for its endemic species of tree - the "No Parking Whitebeam" (Karpatiosorbus admonitor).

References

External links 

Watersmeet House - National Trust

National Trust properties in Devon
Lynton and Lynmouth
Grade II listed buildings in Devon
Lime kilns in the United Kingdom